Collagen and calcium-binding EGF domain-containing protein 1 is a protein that in humans is encoded by the CCBE1 gene.

Function 

CCBE1 is a regulator of the development and growth of the lymphatic system. CCBE1 is necessary for the proteolytic activation of VEGF-C by ADAMTS3, which is the main growth factor for the lymphatic system.

Clinical significance 

Hennekam syndrome type I (a generalized lymphatic dysplasia in humans) is associated with mutations in the CCBE1 gene, and the molecular etiology of the disease has been elucidated.

References

External links

Further reading